Maurício Cortés Armero (born 9 February 1997) is a Colombian professional footballer who plays as a striker for Independiente Medellín.

Club career
Born in Tumaco, Cortés is a product of the football clubs Deportivo Cali, Alianza Deportiva, Club La Mazzia and Selección Valle. After that he had a trial with a Spanish Córdoba CF, but returned to his native Colombia and signed a contract with Independiente Medellín.

In January 2018 Cortés moved to Ukraine, signing a deal with Ukrainian Premier League side FC Karpaty Lviv.

References

External links

1997 births
Living people
People from Tumaco
Colombian footballers
Colombian expatriate footballers
Association football forwards
Deportivo Cali footballers
La Equidad footballers
Independiente Medellín footballers
FC Karpaty Lviv players
Jaguares de Córdoba footballers
Ukrainian Premier League players
Categoría Primera A players
Colombian expatriate sportspeople in Ukraine
Expatriate footballers in Ukraine
Sportspeople from Nariño Department